The following is a list of Austro-Hungarian colonel generals of the Austro-Hungarian Army.

From 1915 to 1918 in the Austro-Hungarian Army, colonel general was an officer rank second only to the rank of field marshal .

In the Austrian Armed Forces of today, there is no rank of colonel general.

List 
This is a list of Austro-Hungarian colonel generals. Those generals later promoted to field marshal are not included. For colonel generals later promoted to field marshal, see List of Austro-Hungarian field marshals.

See also 
 Supreme commanders of the Imperial and Royal Armed Forces
 Comparative officer ranks of World War II
 List of Austrian field marshals
 Army ranks and insignia of the Austro-Hungarian Army
 List of German colonel generals
 List of Colonel Generals

Colonel generals
Colonel generals
Colonel generals